Sir John Maxwell of Nether Pollok (1648–1732), also known by his judicial title Lord Pollok was a Scottish politician and lawyer.

The son of Sir George Maxwell of Auldhouse and Pollok and Annabella Stewart, he trained as a lawyer and became a Privy Counsellor. He was made a baronet in 1682, of Pollok in the County of Renfrew (now Pollokshaws in Glasgow) and was Rector of the University of Glasgow from 1691 to 1718.

He was a Treasury Lord Commissioner in 1696 and 1698 and a Shire Commissioner for Renfrewshire in the Parliament of Scotland for 1689–93, 1695–96 and 1698–99.

He served as Lord Justice Clerk from 1699 to 1702 and succeeded Lord Newbyth as a Senator of the College of Justice from 1699 to his death.

He died at Nether Pollok in 1732. He had married Marian Stewart, daughter of Sir James Stewart of Coltness and Kirkfield. They had no children and he was succeeded in the baronetcy by his nephew John Maxwell of Blawerthill.

References 
 

1648 births
1732 deaths
Lords Justice Clerk
Rectors of the University of Glasgow
Shire Commissioners to the Parliament of Scotland
Baronets in the Baronetage of Nova Scotia
Senators of the College of Justice
Scottish lawyers
John